Brian Satterfield is a former running back in the National Football League.

Biography
Brian Sydney Satterfield was born on December 22, 1969, in Georgia.

Career
Satterfield spent two seasons with the Green Bay Packers.
He is now a Political Science professor at Villanova University.

See also
List of Green Bay Packers players

References

1969 births
Players of American football from Georgia (U.S. state)
Washington Redskins players
Green Bay Packers players
North Alabama Lions football players
Living people